Skyline is an unincorporated community in Mineral County, West Virginia, United States, located at the intersection of U.S. Route 50 and West Virginia Route 42 atop the Allegheny Front. Skyline is best known for its view of Saddle Mountain.

References 

Unincorporated communities in Mineral County, West Virginia
Unincorporated communities in West Virginia
Northwestern Turnpike
Landmarks in West Virginia